John Balderton (fl. 1402) of Lincoln, was an English politician.

He was elected Mayor of Lincoln for 1399–1400 and  a Member (MP) of the Parliament of England for Lincoln in 1402.

References

14th-century births
15th-century deaths
Members of the Parliament of England (pre-1707) for Lincoln
Mayors of Lincoln, England
English MPs 1402